I Wish You Love: More from The Bodyguard is the 25th anniversary reissue of Whitney Houston's soundtrack album The Bodyguard (1992). It was posthumously released on November 17, 2017 by Legacy Recordings.

Background
The album was released to commemorate the 25th anniversary of the movie, The Bodyguard, which marked Houston's film debut. It includes the film versions of her six Bodyguard contributions – "I Will Always Love You," "I Have Nothing," "I'm Every Woman," "Run to You," "Queen of the Night" and "Jesus Loves Me" – as well as remixes and live performances of the songs from The Bodyguard World Tour in 1993–1994.

The album's release coincided with a tribute to Houston and the music of The Bodyguard at the 45th American Music Awards as performed by Christina Aguilera. Ahead of the performance, Aguilera wrote on Instagram, “I am excited, honored and humbled to perform a tribute to one of my idols.”

Commercial performance
After Aguilera's tribute to Houston and the album at American Music Awards, I Wish You Love: More from The Bodyguard debuted at number 165 on the Billboard 200 with 6,000 copies sold the week of December 9, 2017, it also debuted at numbers 9, 22 and 61 on the Soundtracks, Top R&B Albums and Top Album Sales charts, respectively. It also peaked at number 133 in Belgium on November 25, 2017.

Track listing

Personnel

"I Will Always Love You" (Alternate Mix)
Whitney Houston – vocals, vocal arrangement
David Foster – producer, arranger, keyboard
Rickey Minor – director
Kirk Whalum – saxophone solo
Ricky Lawson – drums
Dean Parks, Michael Landau – guitars

"I Have Nothing" (Film Version)
Whitney Houston – vocals
David Foster – keyboards, bass, string arrangement, producer, arranger
Michael Landau – guitar

"I'm Every Woman" (Clivilles & Cole House Mix I Edit)
Whitney Houston – vocals
Narada Michael Walden – producer
Robert Clivilles – additional vocal arrangement and production, remix
David Cole – additional vocal arrangement and production, remix
Vocal arrangement inspired by Chaka Khan

"Run to You" (Film Version)
Whitney Houston – vocals
David Foster – producer, arrangement, string arrangement, bass
Jud Friedman – arrangement, keyboards
John Robinson – drums
Dean Parks – acoustic guitar

"Queen of the Night" (Film Version)
Whitney Houston – vocals, co-producer, vocal arrangement
L.A. Reid – producer, drum programming
Babyface – producer, keyboard, organ, bass and drum programming
Daryl Simmons – co-producer

"Jesus Loves Me" (Film Version)
Whitney Houston, Michele Lamar Richards – vocals

"Jesus Loves Me" (A Capella Version)
Whitney Houston – vocals, vocal arrangement
BeBe Winans – vocal arrangement, arrangement
Cedric J. Caldwell – arrangement

"I Will Always Love You" (Film Version)

"I Have Nothing" (Live)
Recording Date: August 24, 1996
Recording Location: Jerudong Park Amphitheatre, Bandar Seri Begawan, Brunei

"Run to You" (Live)
Recording Date: September 27, 1994
Recording Location: Radio City Music Hall, New York City

"Jesus Loves Me" / "He's Got the Whole World in His Hands" (Live)
Recording Date: April 17, 1994
Recording Location: Estadio Vélez Sarsfield, Buenos Aires, Argentina

"Queen of the Night" (Live)
Recording Date: June 23, 1994
Recording Location: The Spectrum, Philadelphia, Pennsylvania

"I Will Always Love You" (Live)
Recording Date: November 5, 1993
Recording Location: Earls Court Exhibition Centre, London, England

"I'm Every Woman" (Live)
Recording Date: October 14, 1993
Recording Location: Deutschlandhalle, Berlin, Germany

The Bodyguard World Tour 1993-1994: Band
Musicians – Rickey Minor, Paul Jackson Jr., Michael Baker, Wayne LinseyBette Sussman, Bashiri Johnson, Freddie Washington, Carlos RiosGerald Albright, Gary Bias, Kirk Whalum 
Vocals – Gary Houston, Alfie Silas, Pattie Howard, Della Miles, Olivia McClurkin

Production and design
Jeffrey James and Lisa Del Greco – Legacy Recordings A&R
Tina Ibanez – art direction, design
Will McKinney – project direction
Gretchen Brennison – product direction
Mark Wilder – mastering
Vic Anesini, Sean Brennan, Maria Triana – audio engineer
Bill Hedgcock, John Chester, Jamie Howarth – audio engineer

Credits taken from album liner notes

Charts

References

External links
Legacy Recordings|Whitney Houston
I Wish You Love: More from The Bodyguard

Whitney Houston albums
2017 soundtrack albums
Soundtracks published posthumously
Reissue albums